Baghdad Street is a main street in central Damascus, Syria. Located to the north of the old city, the street starts at Sabaa Bahrat Square and ends at Tahrir Square.

Streets in Damascus